Sidney Shapiro (December 23, 1915 – October 18, 2014) was an American-born Chinese lawyer, translator, actor and writer who lived in China from 1947 to 2014. He lived in Beijing for more than 50 years and eventually became a member of the National Committee of the Chinese People's Political Consultative Conference. He was one of very few naturalized citizens of the PRC.

Early life 
Shapiro was born in Brooklyn on December 23, 1915. He was of Ashkenazi Jewish descent. He was a graduate of St. John's University, New York.

Nationality
Shapiro held citizenship of the People's Republic of China from 1963 to the end of his life. In 1983, he was appointed as a member of the Chinese People's Political Consultative Council (CPPCC), which ostensibly provides a forum for input from non-Communist political organizations.

Career
Shapiro trained as a lawyer and was disturbed by perceived inequalities during the Great Depression in the United States. In 1941, he enlisted in the U.S. Army. He applied for French language school, but was sent to a Chinese language school in San Francisco instead. His interest in China led to travel in 1947 to Shanghai, where he met his future wife, an actress named Fengzi (Phoenix), who was a supporter of the Chinese Communist Party. Partly through her influence, Shapiro became a supporter too. He settled in China and remained there after the Communists took power in 1949.

For nearly 50 years, Shapiro was employed by the state-run Foreign Languages Press (FLP) as a translator of works of Chinese literature. He is best known for his  English version of Outlaws of the Marsh, one of the most important classics of Chinese literature. In 1958, he published an English translation of The Family, a novel by Ba Jin or Pa Chin, pen name of Li Yaotang (aka Feigan), one of the most widely read Chinese writers of the 20th century. Certain passages, notably the anarchist elements, were deleted from this edition, but Shapiro later published a full translation.

Shapiro was also an actor in many Chinese movies, becoming typecast as the American villain.

Shapiro wrote a memoir I Chose China: The Metamorphosis of a Country and a Man, but its publication was delayed until 1997 because he feared that it would offend the Chinese authorities.

Personal
Shapiro married Fengzi in 1948, and they had a daughter. Fengzi died in 1996. Shapiro died in Beijing on October 18, 2014. He was 98.

Legacy 
On December 26, 2014, it was announced that the China International Publishing Group was establishing a Sidney Shapiro Research Center to investigate and establish criteria for translation between Chinese and English.

Works

Selected translations from Chinese to English
Ba Jin, The Family, Beijing: Foreign Language Press, 1958
Shi Nai'an, Outlaws of the Marsh, Beijing: Foreign Languages Press, 1980
Ba Jin, Selected Works, Beijing: Foreign Language Press, 1988
Mao Dun, The Shop of the Lin Family and Spring Silkworms, Hong Kong: Chinese University Press, 2004.
Deng Rong, Deng Xiaoping and the Cultural Revolution: A Daughter Recalls the Critical Years, New York: C. Bertelsmann, 2005

Works compiled and edited
Jews in Old China: Studies by Chinese Scholars, New York: Hippocrene Books, 1984; paperback edition: Hippocrene Books, 1988

Memoirs
An American in China: Thirty Years in the People's Republic. New American Library 1979.
I Chose China: The Metamorphosis of a Country and a Man, Hippocrene Books 1997.

See also

History of the Jews in China
Israel Epstein
Kaifeng Jews
Rewi Alley
Sidney Rittenberg

References

External links 
 gluckman.com
 Profile of Shapiro from The National, 15 August 2008

1915 births
2014 deaths
Male actors from New York City
American emigrants to China
Chinese–English translators
Chinese Jews
Chinese male film actors
Chinese non-fiction writers
Chinese people of American-Jewish descent
Jewish American attorneys
Jewish American male actors
Jewish American writers
Lawyers from New York City
Naturalized citizens of the People's Republic of China
St. John's University (New York City) alumni
Writers from Brooklyn
American magazine founders
21st-century American Jews